Alexandru A. Bădărău (April 9, 1859–March 27, 1927) was a Romanian politician, academic, and journalist.

Born in Bădărăi, Iași County (now in Botoșani County), his father was the local mayor. He studied at the National College in Iași, graduating first in his class in 1877. He then entered the University of Iași, but was expelled in 1881 for participating in the socialist movement. Bădărău continued his education at the University of Paris, where he obtained a law degree, also earning a diploma from the École Libre des Sciences Politiques. He then took a doctorate in literature and philosophy from the Free University of Brussels. While there, he took part in a socialist circle that published Dacia viitoare magazine in 1883.

After returning home in 1885, he became a French teacher at two schools in Iași as well as a psychology professor within the local university's literature faculty. Together with George Panu, he founded the Radical Democratic Party in 1888; this merged with the Conservative Party (PC) in 1897. He was elected to the Assembly of Deputies as a PC candidate. In 1908, he left the Conservative Party, following Take Ionescu into the Conservative-Democratic Party.

Bădărău was mayor of Iași from 1899 to 1901, undertaking a vigorous civic activity. One of his priorities was to create a public water-supply system to bring water from the Prut River to the city; he argued at length with his predecessor, Nicolae Gane, who favored bringing water from Timișești. After he left office, the Timișești variant was chosen, and Bădărău went there in April 1907 for the start of the works.

He twice served as minister in Conservative cabinets: under Gheorghe Grigore Cantacuzino, he was Justice Minister from December 1904 to June 1906; under Titu Maiorescu, he was Public Works Minister from October 1912 to December 1913. After World War I, he founded Opinia newspaper, where he was a frequent contributor. He died in Iași and was buried in the city's Eternitatea Cemetery.

Notes

References
Dinu C. Giurescu, Dicționar biografic de istorie a României. Bucharest: Editura Meronia, 2008, 

1859 births
1927 deaths
Academic staff of Alexandru Ioan Cuza University
Burials at Eternitatea cemetery
Conservative Party (Romania, 1880–1918) politicians
Conservative-Democratic Party politicians
Free University of Brussels (1834–1969) alumni
Mayors of Iași
Members of the Chamber of Deputies (Romania)
People from Botoșani County
Romanian opinion journalists
Romanian socialists
Romanian schoolteachers
Romanian Ministers of Justice
Romanian Ministers of Public Works
University of Paris alumni
Romanian expatriates in France